Terence Anthony Moran, CB (born 1960) is a British civil servant and public administrator. He was the Second Permanent Secretary in the Department for Work and Pensions (2012–13) and chief executive of the Disability and Carers Service (2004–07) and its successor, the Pension, Disability and Carers Service (2008–10).

Career

Early career 
Born in 1960 into a working-class family from Rotherham, Moran joined HM Civil Service straight after finishing at a comprehensive school in 1977. He started work in a clerical role in the Department of Health and Social Security, but was eventually promoted into "delivery roles", before spending time working on policy; he was private secretary to Sir Nick Montagu (1990-91) and Sir Michael Bichard (1992-96). Moran eventually become an area manager in the Benefits Agency in 2001, before being appointed a regional director in Jobcentre Plus (which replaced the Benefits Agency) in 2002.

Senior civil servant 
In 2004, he was appointed chief executive of the newly formed Disability and Carers Service; in the first year, he was paid a salary of £105,000–110,000. In July 2007, he moved to The Pension Service to succeed Alexis Cleveland as interim chief executive, serving until April 2008 when the agency was merged with the Disability and Carers Service into the Pension, Disability and Carers Service; he then became the chief executive of that agency, serving until November 2010. According to The Daily Telegraph, in 2010 he was earning between £155,000-159,000 a year in this role. 

After leaving his post at the Pension, Disability and Carers Service, he served as Director-General, Universal Credit, in the Department for Work and Pensions (DWP) until December 2011, and thereafter was the DWP's chief operating officer (COO) at director-general grade until March 2013; this coincided with his appointment as the department's Second Permanent Secretary from July 2012 to March 2013. During his time as COO, Moran publicly complained that doubts over the development of the programme were demoralising staff. He also attracted media attention for suggesting that he would like to publicly shame fraudulent benefit claimants, saying that "If I had my way I would put their photograph[s] on every lamp-post in the street where they live". 

Moran was placed on sick leave in late 2012; in 2016, he wrote about this period in The Guardian to raise awareness about mental health. He retired from the civil service in March 2013.

Post-retirement 
Between 2014 and 2017, Moran was a non-executive director of the Hull University Teaching Hospitals NHS Trust; he was then appointed chairman for two years ending March 2019.

Honours and awards 
Moran was appointed a Companion of the Order of the Bath (CB) in the 2007 Birthday Honours.

References 

British civil servants

Living people
1960 births
People from Rotherham
Companions of the Order of the Bath